Dominique Danton Thompson-Williams (born April 21, 1995) is an American professional baseball outfielder who is currently a free agent.

Career
Thompson-Williams attended East High School in Sioux City, Iowa. In 2013, he was named the state's high school baseball player of the year. In 2014, he attended Iowa Western Community College. He transferred to the University of South Carolina to play for the South Carolina Gamecocks for the 2016 season.

The New York Yankees selected Thompson-Williams in the fifth round, with the 158th overall selection, of the 2016 MLB draft, and he signed with the Yankees, beginning his professional career. He made his professional debut with the Staten Island Yankees of the Class A Short Season New York-Penn League, batting .246 with three home runs, 16 RBIs, and 15 stolen bases in 56 games.

In 2017, Thompson-Williams began the year with Staten Island before the Yankees promoted him to the Charleston RiverDogs of the Class A South Atlantic League in August. In 64 games between both clubs, he hit .244 with three home runs and 28 RBIs.

Thompson-Williams began the 2018 season with Charleston and received a midseason promotion to the Tampa Tarpons of the Class A-Advanced Florida State League. The Yankees promoted him to the Trenton Thunder of the Class AA Eastern League for the playoffs. In 100 total games for the year, he slashed .299/.363/.546 with 22 home runs, 74 RBIs, and twenty stolen bases.

On November 19, 2018, the Yankees traded Thompson-Williams, Justus Sheffield, and Erik Swanson to the Seattle Mariners for James Paxton. He started the 2019 season with the Arkansas Travelers of the Class AA Texas League. He was released on April 2, 2022.

References

External links

Living people
1995 births
People from Sioux City, Iowa
Baseball players from Iowa
Baseball outfielders
Iowa Western Reivers baseball players
South Carolina Gamecocks baseball players
Staten Island Yankees players
Charleston RiverDogs players
Tampa Tarpons players
Trenton Thunder players
Arkansas Travelers players
African-American baseball players